River Wonders, formerly known as River Safari, is a river-themed zoo and aquarium located in Mandai, Singapore, forming part of the Mandai Wildlife Reserve. It is the first of its kind in Asia and features freshwater exhibits and a river boat ride as its main highlights. The safari was built at a cost of S$160m, with an expected visitor rate of 820,000 people yearly.

The Giant Panda Forest was opened to the public on 29 November 2012, with a soft opening on 3 April 2013, attracting close to 1,500 visitors. This attraction is the fourth zoo in Singapore, along with the Singapore Zoo, Jurong Bird Park, and Night Safari, all of which are managed by Mandai Wildlife Group. The park was officially opened on 28 February 2014, and it was announced that more than 1.1 million have visited the River Safari since its soft opening in April 2013.

On 13 October 2021, River Safari was renamed to River Wonders.

Construction
Conceptualization of such as River Wonders (then known as River Safari) began in early 2007, and its construction was officially announced to the public on 11 February 2009 with an estimated completion date of late 2011. The project began with an estimated budget of S$140 million as well as an annual visitor rate of 750,000, however since the original announcement in 2009 the budget has since increased by S$20 million in 2010, due to rising construction costs, to S$160 million and the annual visitor rate has also increased to 820,000.

The park is built within the current  compound already shared by the Singapore Zoo and Night Safari and occupies , making it the smallest of the three parks.

Exhibits
River Gems
This tank and aviary displays various species of smaller fish like tetras, danios and gouramis.

Black phantom tetra
Cardinal tetra
Crested guineafowl
Flying fox
Pearl gourami
Penguin tetra
Rainbow shark
Rummy-nose tetra
Trumpeter hornbill

River of Africa

Aba aba
African jewelfish
Atlantic tarpon
Bluegray mbuna
Cobalt blue zebra cichlid
Congo tetra
Eastern bottle-nosed mormyrid
Fahaka pufferfish
Golden mbuna
Peters's elephantnose fish
Reedfish
Tailspot ctenopoma
Zebra tilapia

Congo River
The Congo River area consists of a pond containing various Lake Malawi cichlids and birds in a paludarium setup. 

Bumblebee cichlid
Cotton pygmy goose
Featherfin squeaker
Giraffe hap
Red zebra cichlid
Ringed teal
Spindle hap
Violet turaco
Von der Decken's hornbill

Lake Tanganyika

Blue neon cichlid
Blunthead cichlid
Compressed cichlid
Cuckoo catfish
Fairy cichlid
Lemon cichlid
Red-spot callochromis
Sardine cichlid

Nile River
African arowana
African pike
African tigerfish
Giraffe catfish
Goliath tigerfish
Nile bichir
Saddled bichir

Ganges River

Black pond turtle
Clown featherback
Gharial
Giant gourami
Giant snakehead

Mary River

Australian lungfish
Banded archerfish
Boeseman's rainbowfish
Eastern rainbowfish
Jade perch
Mangrove horseshoe crab
Orange rainbowfish
Pearse's mudskipper
Red rainbowfish

Mekong River
The main attraction of this area is a large tank that houses several giant fish from the Mekong. Several smaller tanks feature smaller fish species. There is also an aviary based on a rice paddy field in Thailand with Asian birds.

Asian arowana
Black-faced spoonbill
Black pond turtle
Chinese water dragon
Dolphin barb
Fire eel
Giant freshwater stingray
Giant pangasius
Green imperial pigeon
Indian muntjac
Iridescent shark
Jullien's golden carp
Lion-tailed macaque
Masked lapwing
Mekong giant catfish
Nankeen night heron
Painted stork
Philippine sailfin lizard
Siamese giant carp
Spotted whistling duck
Wallago
Vietnamese pheasant
Vietnamese pond turtle

Yangtze River
This precinct houses several rare species from the Yangtze River. A small tank houses giant salamanders and an aquarium holds several large fish like sturgeons and carps.
The Giant Panda Forest spans 1500 square-metres and is specially climate-controlled enclosure which change to simulate the panda's natural habitat. As of 2022, it is home to a male and female pair named Kai Kai (凯凯) and Jia Jia (嘉嘉) and their cub Le Le (叻叻). Red pandas are also housed in this area. Visitors can watch the staff prepare fresh bamboo daily for the pandas.

Amur sturgeon
Chinese giant salamander
Chinese high-fin banded shark
Chinese softshell turtle
False gharial
Giant panda
Grass carp
Phoenix barb
Red panda

Amazon River Quest
The park features a boat ride called the Amazon River Quest. It features several wildlife species from the Amazon River.

American flamingo
Black howler
Brown-headed spider monkey
Capybara
Collared peccary
Common squirrel monkey
Giant anteater
Guanaco
Guyanan red howler
Jaguar
Patagonian mara
Red-backed bearded saki
South American coati
South American tapir
Tufted capuchin
White-faced saki

Wild Amazonia
Golden dorado
Golden-headed lion tamarin
Green anaconda
Oscar
Silver arowana
Suckermouth catfish

Amazonia Encounters
Azara's agouti
Cuvier's dwarf caiman
White-lipped tamarin
Yellow-footed tortoise
Yellow-spotted river turtle

Amazon Flooded Forest
The Amazon Flooded Forest is a large indoor complex that features a wide variety of species from the Amazon River. This complex boasts the largest tank in the park which holds a group of manatees and several large Amazonian fish. River Wonders has had success in breeding the manatees. In August 2016, two young male manatees named Junior and Kai were released into a protected bay in Guadeloupe to participate in a breeding programme. However, on October 2 2016, Junior died of a renal failure. 

Altum angelfish
Arapaima
Black-finned pacu
Black ghost knifefish
Blue discus
Cardinal tetra
Cockatoo cichlid
Colombian tetra
Electric eel
Giant otter
Ocellate river stingray
Red-bellied piranha
Red phantom tetra
Redtail catfish
Royal tetra
Rummy-nose tetra
Striped silver dollar
West Indian manatee
Xingu River ray

Attractions
The park boasts a tropical rainforest setting along with as river theme with various animal attractions, theme park rides and other major exhibits.

Giant pandas
One of the main attractions is a pair of male and female giant pandas – Kai Kai (凯凯) and Jia Jia (嘉嘉) – which are housed in a specially constructed climate-controlled enclosure which change throughout the four seasons emulating their original environment. The zoo grows its own  plantation of special bamboo specially for the feeding of the giant pandas. These pandas are a sign of the twentieth anniversary of friendly Sino-Singapore relations. The park also received a conservation donation from CapitaLand. The names of the two pandas were selected from entries of a public naming competition organised in 2010. The pandas, which arrived in September 2012, are on a ten-year loan from China.

On 14 August 2021, a panda cub was born to Kai Kai and Jia Jia, later revealed to be a male on 10 September. This was the first after seven breeding rounds since 2015, which did not yield any cubs. The panda cub was conceived via artificial insemination.

During the first few days after the cub was born, Jia Jia was given fluids as well as a glucose diet to get through the trying period with her mothering skills improving by the day.

Subsequently, on 26 August 2021, Mandai Wildlife Reserve (then Wildlife Reserves Singapore) announced that the cub will return to China once it turns two, the age when it matures. The cub also has black markings being more apparent by the day. Discussions are also ongoing with Chinese authorities to extend Kai Kai and Jia Jia's stay beyond 2022, the initial period when the pandas are supposed to return. This is to allow for more breeding programmes to be conducted after the cub separates from the parents.

On 22 September 2021, the cub opened his eyes to the world for the first time when he was 40 days old with the panda cub weighing 1.87kg, an increase of 370g from the previous week. Two weeks later, the panda weighed 2.638kg as at 1 October.

On 8 October 2021, the cub was revealed to have teeth quicker than expected, given that the teeth were formed two months after birth instead of the three typically. This meant that it could start eating bamboo soon. Six teeth were seen, with the first forming on 23 September. On 6 October, the panda weighed over 3kg with its length taken as 51.5cm from head to tail. The panda weighed 4.18kg as of 22 October with the length at 59.5cm from head to tail.

It was revealed on 19 November 2021 that the panda took its first steps and weighed 6kg with a length of 67cm.

On 29 December 2021, the panda was named Le Le (叻叻) based on the name "Shi Le Po" (石叻坡), an old Chinese term for Singapore. Le Le debuted the following day at its new nursery in the Giant Panda Forest. On 10 March 2022, Le Le joined Jia Jia in the main exhibit with the information board unveiled.

Theme park rides
The park's boat ride, the Amazon River Quest, was opened to visitors on 7 December 2013. It takes visitors through several animals from South America.

A 15-minute Reservoir Cruise on the Upper Seletar Reservoir, will travel along the outskirts of Singapore Zoo and the Night Safari compound, which border on the reservoir, giving visitors a chance to spot animals including giraffes and Asian elephants. Tickets are priced at S$5 for adults and S$3 for children aged three to 12, on top of River Wonders admission. Each cruise can take up to 40 passengers and runs at 15-minute intervals from 10.30am to 6.00pm daily. The boats are wheelchair-friendly. The ride opened on 1 August 2014.

Gallery

Transportation

Public transportation
River Wonders is not served directly by MRT line with the nearest station being the Springleaf MRT station.

There are two bus services operated by SBS Transit and SMRT Buses which calls at the bus stop near to the Zoo.

Bus
A shuttle service, known as the Mandai Shuttle, plies daily between Khatib MRT station and the Zoo. A one-way trip cost $1 for everyone above the age of three. A separate service, known as the Mandai Express, operates on selected weekends and holidays to and from three locations in Bedok, Sengkang, and Tampines. A one-way trip cost between $1 and $3 for everyone above the age of three.

See also
 Underwater World, Singapore
 Marine Life Park

External links
 Official website

References

2012 establishments in Singapore
Safari parks
Tourist attractions in Singapore
Zoos in Singapore